Poets who wrote their poetry in Yugoslavia.

 Ivo Andrić (1892–1975)

 Matej Bor (1913–1993)

 Miloš Crnjanski (1893–1977)

 Oskar Davičo (1909–1989)

 Karel Destovnik (1922–1944)
 Jure Kaštelan (1919–1990)
 Edvard Kocbek (1904–1981)
 Srečko Kosovel (1904–1926)
 Ivan Goran Kovačić (1913–1943)
 Gustav Krklec (1899–1977)
 Miroslav Krleža (1893–1981)

 Desanka Maksimović (1898–1993)
 Slavko Mihalić (1928–2007)
 Milan Milišić (1941–1991)
 Ivan Minatti (1924–2012)

 Vladimir Nazor (1876–1949)

 Vesna Parun (1922–2010)
 Anton Podbevšek (1898–1981)
 Vasko Popa (1922–1991)

 Marko Ristić (1902–1984)

 Antun Branko Šimić (1898–1925)
 Aco Šopov (1923–1982)

 Jože Udovič (1912–1986)

 Aleksandar Vučo (1897–1985)

See also
Yugoslav literature (disambiguation)

Lists of poets
Yugoslav poets
poets